Jia Boyan (born 30 November 2003) is a Chinese footballer currently playing as a forward for Druga HNL club NK Dubrava on loan from Swiss Super League club Grasshopper.

Club career
Jia Boyan would play for the Shanghai SIPG youth teams where he personally scored 17 goals in the 2018 U15 National Championship. He would soon be promoted to the senior team by Head coach Vítor Pereira for the 2020 Chinese Super League season where he made his debut on 31 August 2020 in a league game against Tianjin TEDA F.C. in a 4-1 victory where he came on as a substitute for Marko Arnautović. At 16 years old and 275 days, Jia became the third youngest player in Chinese Super League history, and was included in The Guardian's "Next Generation 2020".

On 16 February 2022, Jia joined Swiss Super League club Grasshoppers and was immediately loaned to Druga HNL club NK Dubrava. During his first year there, he was mostly playing for the U19 squad. He made his debut for the first team in the second round of the Croatian Football Cup, where he shot the first goal in the second minute in a 2-3 defeat to HNK Gorica.

Career statistics

Club

Notes

References

External links

2003 births
Living people
People from Luoyang
Footballers from Henan
Chinese footballers
China youth international footballers
Association football forwards
Shanghai Port F.C. players
Grasshopper Club Zürich players
Chinese Super League players
China League Two players
Expatriate footballers in Switzerland
Chinese expatriate sportspeople in Switzerland
Expatriate footballers in Croatia
Chinese expatriate sportspeople in Croatia